The Capital News Service (CNS) is a news wire affiliated with the University of Maryland, College Park.

Facilitating student reporting

Operated by the Philip Merrill College of Journalism at the University of Maryland, Capital News Service provides students with real-life reporting experiences—covering a beat, developing sources, generating story ideas and writing on deadline—all in close consultation with an instructor/editor.

Capital News Service operates across all platforms: Print bureaus in Annapolis and Washington, D.C., provide a daily news feed to scores of clients, including daily and weekly newspapers, wire services, radio, television and online news outlets; the broadcast bureau produces a nightly newscast that goes to more than 400,000 households in suburban Washington; and an online newsmagazine, Maryland Newsline, does original news and feature reporting while showcasing work from the print and broadcast operations.

The print bureaus transmit about 300 stories each semester for publication. Each student typically produces 25 to 30 stories that are usually picked up by several clients, giving students as many as 90 clips for the semester. CNS news, feature and investigative stories often appear on A1 of client papers, and have appeared in The Washington Post, The (Baltimore) Sun and The Washington Times. Select stories are sent to the McClatchy-Tribune News Service for distribution, and have appeared in The Philadelphia Inquirer, The Pittsburgh Post-Gazette and the San Jose (Calif.) Mercury News, among other papers. The program has led directly to top internships and reporting jobs for most CNS alumni.

Selected Merrill College of Journalism undergraduates and graduate students in the public affairs reporting sequence receive 12 credits in their bureau semester. The program is divided into three sections:

Bureau
Students receive six credits for acting as full-time (35 to 40 hours a week) reporters from Tuesday through Friday, covering either Annapolis or Washington for Capital News Service.

Press Seminar
Participants also are enrolled in an upper-level journalism seminar on Mondays with Knight Chair Haynes Johnson, one of the college's Pulitzer Prize–winning faculty members. The class explores various topics in public affairs reporting, often with guest lecturers.

Public Affairs Seminar or Advanced Writing Course
Students can receive their final three credits from a School of Public Policy class designed specifically for the bureau program or by taking an advanced writing or reporting course with the college's award-winning faculty.

CNS Clients

Daily newspapers
The Washington Post
The Baltimore Sun
The Washington Times
McClatchy-Tribune Information Services
The Baltimore Examiner
The Washington Examiner
The (Annapolis) Capital
Hagerstown Herald-Mail
Frederick News-Post
Carroll County Times
The (Salisbury) Daily Times
Cumberland Times-News
Cambridge Daily Banner
Easton Star-Democrat
Daily Record

Weekly and monthly newspapers
The Afro-American
The Baltimore Guide
The Calvert Recorder
The (St. Mary's) County Times
Dundalk Eagle
The Eagle News
The Enterprise (St. Mary's County)
The (Frederick) County Globe
The (Garrett County) Republican
Gazette Newspapers (42 editions)
The Insurance Advisor Monthly
The Maryland Independent (Charles County)
Montgomery Sentinel
Montgomery Times
Patuxent Newspapers (12 editions)
Prince George's Post
Prince George's Sentinel
St. Mary's Today
Street Sense
The Takoma Voice
The Washington Informer

Online news websites
The Bay Net
The Calvert News
FoxNews.com
shoreupdate.com
Southern Maryland Online
stateline.org
Maryland Newsline
washingtonpost.com

Broadcast outlets
Maryland Public Television
WTOP News Radio
CTV-76 (Community Television of Prince George's County)
UMTV

References

External links
 
 CNS human trafficking series wins national award http://marylandreporter.com/2016/09/19/cns-human-trafficking-series-wins-national-award/
 Nursing homes’ push for profit can clash with patient needs 
 Advocates seek immunity for youth victims of sex trafficking http://www.fredericknewspost.com/public/ap/advocates-seek-immunity-for-youth-victims-of-sex-trafficking/article_b6dac65a-2cd5-53fc-8e6e-c05ace1d46b5.html

University of Maryland, College Park
University of Maryland, College Park student organizations